Inès Konan Akissi (born 8 January 2002), known as Inès Konan, is an Ivorian footballer who plays for the Ivory Coast women's national team.

International career
Konan capped for Ivory Coast at senior level during the 2020 CAF Women's Olympic Qualifying Tournament (fourth round).

See also
List of Ivory Coast women's international footballers

References

2002 births
Living people
Ivorian women's footballers
Ivory Coast women's international footballers
Women's association footballers not categorized by position